NGC 473 is a lenticular galaxy in the constellation of Pisces. It was discovered on December 20, 1786 by William Herschel.

References

External links
 

0473
Pisces (constellation)
Lenticular galaxies
Astronomical objects discovered in 1786
4785
859
Discoveries by William Herschel